The Women's 400 metres at the 2008 Summer Olympics took place on 16–19 August at the Beijing National Stadium.

The qualifying standards were 51.55 s (A standard) and 52.35 s (B standard).

Favourites for the event included Sanya Richards-Ross and the reigning world champion, Christine Ohuruogu. In the final, Richards-Ross made a rapid start and quickly took the lead, while Ohuruogu ran a more even-paced race, but was well down the field entering the final straight. However, in the last 100 metres Richard-Ross, clearly tired from her earlier effort, began to tie up badly, while Ohuruogu began to surge through the field. At the line, Great Britain's Christine Ohuruogu won in 49.62 seconds to add the Olympic title to her World title, just pipping Shericka Williams by 0.07 seconds to take gold. Richards-Ross faded to third, and bronze, in 49.93.

Records
Prior to this competition, the existing world and Olympic records were as follows:

No new world or Olympic records were set for this event.

Results

Round 1
Qualification: First 3 in each heat (Q) and the next 3 fastest (q) advance to the Semifinals.

Semifinals
Qualification: First 2 in each heat (Q) and the next 2 fastest {q} advance to the Final.

Final

References

Athletics at the 2008 Summer Olympics
400 metres at the Olympics
2008 in women's athletics
Women's events at the 2008 Summer Olympics